Flagstone may refer to:
 Flagstone, a flat stone, usually used for paving slabs or walkways, patios, fences and roofing, or for memorials, headstones, facades and other constructions
 Flagstone, a fictional town and a key setting in the 1968 Sergio Leone spaghetti Western film Once Upon a Time in the West
 "The Flagstones" was the working title of the TV show that would later become The Flintstones

Places
 Flagstone, Queensland, suburb of Logan City
 Flagstone Creek, Queensland, rural locality of Lockyer Valley
 Flagstones Enclosure, a Neolithic ditch enclosure in the English county of Dorset